Torje Naustdal (born 26 April 2000) is a Norwegian football midfielder who plays for FK Haugesund.

A youth product of Florø SK, he made his senior debut in the 2017 1. divisjon. After Florø later became relegated, Naustdal was picked up by Strømmen IF and then FK Haugesund. He made his Eliteserien debut in August 2021 against Molde.

References

2000 births
Living people
People from Flora, Norway
Norwegian footballers
Florø SK players
Strømmen IF players
FK Haugesund players
Norwegian First Division players
Eliteserien players
Association football midfielders
Norway youth international footballers
Sportspeople from Vestland